BG or bg may refer to:

Organizations

Businesses
 Bergdorf Goodman, a department store on 5th Avenue, New York, US
 Bord Gáis Energy, an Irish gas supplier
 Bowman Gilfillan, a South African law firm
 British Gas (disambiguation) (privatised and later split between BG plc and Centrica)
 BG Group, one part of the demerged British Gas plc

Education
 Bishop Grosseteste University, a higher education institution in Lincoln, UK
 Bishop Guertin High School, Nashua, New Hampshire, US
 Bowling Green State University, Ohio, US
 Bones Gate, a fraternity at Dartmouth College, US

Music
 Bee Gees (BGs), an English-Australian music group.
 B.G. (rapper) ("Baby Gangsta" or "B. Gizzle"), stage name of American rapper Christopher N. Dorsey.
 B.G. Knocc Out, American rapper.
 B.G., the Prince of Rap, Bernard Greene, American rapper and dance music artist.
 Benny Goodman, American jazz musician.
 Blind Guardian, a German power metal band.
 Boris Grebenshchikov, Russian singer and poet, leader of the band Aquarium.
 BarlowGirl, an American all-female Christian rock band.

Places

Europe
 Belgrade, the capital of Serbia
 Province of Bergamo (vehicle registration plate code), Italy
 Birmingham (vehicle registration plate code), England
 Blaenau Gwent, a county borough in Wales
 Bosnia and Herzegovina (WMO country code)
 Bulgaria (ISO country code)
 Bundesgrenzschutz (vehicle registration plate code), Germany

United States
 Bowling Green, Kentucky
 Bowling Green, Ohio
 Buffalo Grove, Illinois

Elsewhere
 Bangladesh (obsolete NATO country code)

 British Guiana, former name of Guyana

Police and military
 Border guard, police that operate at sovereign borders
 Brigadier general, a military rank (more often written "BGen")
 Great Lakes BG, a US Navy dive-bomber aircraft

Science and technology
 bg (Unix), a Unix command for background processes
 .bg, the ccTLD for Bulgaria
 Basal ganglia, a group of nuclei in the brain
 Blood glucose or blood sugar level
 Bus grant, a control bus signal

Transportation
 Brake Gangwayed, a type of railway coach
 Broad gauge, in railways
 Biman Bangladesh Airlines (IATA airline code BG)
 Bingham and Garfield Railway, in Utah, US

Other uses
 Bulgarian language (ISO 639 alpha-2 language code: bg)
 Bangkok Glass F.C., a football team
 Board game

See also
 BGS (disambiguation)